Block Line is a stop on the Region of Waterloo's Ion rapid transit system. It is located alongside Courtland Avenue in Kitchener, just north of Block Line Road. It opened on June 21, 2019.

Access to the platform is from the south, from the Block Line sidewalk; and from the north, from the Courtland and Hillmount intersection.

The station features the artwork Three Sisters by  Haudenosaunee/ Anishinaabe artists Lindsey Lickers and Katharine Harvey, having a digitally printed glass wall with images narrating the history and culture of the First Peoples.

With the adjustment of bus routes following the launch of light rail service in June 2019, several routes require buses to perform U-turns to stop at the station. This is stated to be a temporary measure until bus bays and a bus terminal are built.

References

External links

 

Ion light rail stations
Railway stations in Kitchener, Ontario
2019 establishments in Ontario